the Dominican Republic women's national football team is the representative of the Dominican Republic in international women's association football, It is governed by the Dominican Football Federation (Federación Dominicana de Fútbol) and it competes as a member of the Confederation of North, Central America, and Caribbean Association Football (CONCACAF).

The national team's first appearance was in the CFU Qualifying for the 2002 CONCACAF Women's Gold Cup entering the first round the team was drawn against Haiti, Saint Lucia and the Bahamas. they settled for a draw in the opening match against Saint Lucia, later on, the group saw the Dominican Republic beat the Bahamas three to nil and lose their final game against Haiti.

In 2007, during the 2008 CONCACAF Women's Olympic Qualifying Tournament qualification The Dominican Republic opened Group D of the Digicel Cup and in so doing re-wrote the history books as they annihilated the British Virgin Islands by a scoreline never before seen in the entire CONCACAF region for international football. The margin of 17 clear goals, while keeping a clean sheet, is unrivaled in football in the history of the game across the CONCACAF region in all international competitions.

As of 13 October 2022, the Dominican Republic's team is ranked 109th worldwide, and 13th in the CONCACAF region. they are yet to mark their debut in big-stage competitions.

Record per opponent
Key

The following table shows Dominican Republic' all-time official international record per opponent:

Results

2002

2003

2006

2007

2010

2011

2012

2014

2015

2018

2019

2021

2022

See also
 Dominican Republic national football team results
 Football in the Dominican Republic

References

External links
 Dominican Republic results on The Roon Ba
 Dominican Republic results on Globalsports
 Dominican Republic results on soccerway

2000s in the Dominican Republic
2010s in the Dominican Republic
2020s in the Dominican Republic
Women's national association football team results
results